Surk-e Sofla (also Romanized as Sūrk-e Soflá; also known as Sūrak-e Pā’īn and Sūrk-e Pā’īn) is a village in Nadushan Rural District, Meybod District, Meybod County, Yazd Province, Iran. At the 2006 census, its population was 203, in 75 families.

References 

Populated places in Saduq County